Paul Aeby (born 10 September 1910, date of death unknown) was a Swiss footballer who played for Switzerland in the 1938 FIFA World Cup. He also played for BSC Young Boys, FC Grenchen, and FC Bern 1894. He was Georges Aeby's elder brother.

References

1910 births
Year of death missing
Sportspeople from the canton of Fribourg
Swiss men's footballers
Switzerland international footballers
1938 FIFA World Cup players
Association football forwards
BSC Young Boys players
FC Grenchen players
FC Bern players
People from Fribourg